Collège Alpin International Beau Soleil, known more informally as Beau Soleil, is a private boarding school in Switzerland. The college provides a full boarding education for students aged 11–18 years old from 50 different countries.

Beau Soleil has been listed by The Daily Telegraph as "One of the Most Exclusive Schools in the World".

Notable alumni
 Nikola Shterev — Canadian race driver
 Princess Marie of Denmark
 Guillaume, Hereditary Grand Duke of Luxembourg
 Prince Félix of Luxembourg
 Princess Claire of Luxembourg
 Sir Peter O'Sullevan — Irish-British horse racing commentator and journalist
 Tina Cooper — English paediatrician
 Alexandre Mourreau — Swiss-Italian businessman

See also

 List of international schools
 Lyceum Alpinum Zuoz
 Institut Le Rosey
 Aiglon College
 American School in Switzerland
 Institut Auf Dem Rosenberg
Ecole D'Humanité

References

External links
 
 Exact Location

Private schools in Switzerland
Boarding schools in Switzerland
Education in Villars-sur-Ollon
International schools in Switzerland
International Baccalaureate schools in Switzerland